Abang Haji Abdul Rahman Zohari bin Abang Haji Openg (Jawi: ابڠ عبد الرحمن جوهري بن ابڠ اوڤيڠ; born 4 August 1950), familiarly known as Abang Jo or Abang Johari, is a Malaysian politician who has served as the head of government of Sarawak since January 2017. He has been Member of the Sarawak State Legislative Assembly (MLA) for Gedong since 2021, having previously being the MLA for Satok from 1981 to 2021. He was also the MLA for Satok between May 1981 and December 2021.

Abang Johari took over as the chief minister following the death of his predecessor Adenan Satem in January 2017. He is a member and the current president of Parti Pesaka Bumiputera Bersatu (PBB), a component party of state ruling Gabungan Parti Sarawak (GPS) coalition which is aligned with federal ruling Barisan Nasional (BN) and Perikatan Nasional (PN) coalitions. He is also the first chairman of GPS since its formation in June 2018.

Early life and education 
Abang Johari was born in Limbang on 4 August 1950, to Abang Openg Abang Sapiee and Dayang Masniah Abdul Rahman. He is the youngest of ten siblings. His father, Abang Openg, was the first Yang di-Pertua Negeri of Sarawak and one of the local prominent figures active in several Sarawak independence movements.

Abang Johari's education began at Merpati Jepang Primary School, Kuching. He later pursued secondary education at St. Joseph Secondary School, Kuching.

In 1969, Abang Johari's father died when he was 19 years old.

Early career 
After finishing school, Abang Johari then worked with Malaysia Airlines as an executive officer.  He earned a Master of Business Administration (MBA) degree from Henley College, Brunel University.

Political career 
In the early 1970s, there were several active youth organisations in Sarawak. Among them are the Federation of Sarawak Malay Youth Clubs, Sarawak Youth Council and Bidayuh Youth Club. In 1972, the leaders of these organizations met and agreed to merge and establish the Sarawak United National Youth Organisation (SABERKAS). Abdul Rahman Ya'kub, the then Chief Minister of Sarawak, was appointed as the first president of SABERKAS in 1973. Abang Johari at that time was also active in SABERKAS. At the same time, he had already joined the Parti Pesaka Bumiputera Bersatu (PBB), a component of the ruling Barisan Nasional (BN) that governed the federal and state. In 1977, Abang Johari officially entered politics for the first time at the age of 27 when he was appointed as PBB youth chief.

In 1981, incumbent Member of Sarawak State Legislative Assembly (MLA) for Satok, Abang Abu Bakar Abang Mustapha announced his resignation from the seat. Following that, in line with the constitution, it paved the way for a by-election to be held. Abang Johari refused to accept the offer from Chief Minister Abdul Rahman Ya'kub to run for the seat. He deliberately gave an excuse to avoid Abdul Rahman's offer. Abdul Rahman had met with Abang Johari's mother, Dayang Masniah to discuss the matter. Abang Johari then asked his mother for her views on Abdul Rahman's offer. He recalled his mother telling him "not to argue with the older people". He had no choice but to accept Abdul Rahman's offer in the end. Later, he accepted the offer and won the Satok seat. In 1982, Abang Johari was appointed as the principal political secretary to Chief Minister Abdul Taib Mahmud.

Ministerial career (1984–2017) 
Abang Johari was re-elected in 1983 state election, and was appointed as the Assistant Minister for Regional Development and Community Development a year later.

After the 1987 state election, in which he retained his Satok seat, Abang Johari was promoted as full minister, and was admitted to the state cabinet under Chief Minister Abdul Taib Mahmud. He was appointed as the Minister of Industrial Development.

In 2000, Abang Johari was appointed Minister of Tourism. In the 2001 state election, he managed to retain once again his seat. He held the ministerial post until 2004.

In a cabinet reshuffle made by Abdul Taib in 2004, Abang Johari was appointed Minister of Housing. He maintained his victory in his seat in the 2006 state election.

In 2009, Abang Johari kept his previous post, but added the portfolio of Urbanisation to it, making him the Minister of Housing and Urbanisation. He served until 2011.

After regaining his seat in the 2011 state election, Abang Johari was named Minister of Tourism for the second time by Abdul Taib.

Abdul Taib's resignation 
On 12 February 2014, Chief Minister Abdul Taib announced that he would resign at the end of the month, spending roughly 33 years in office. After the announcement, Abang Johari was considered a potential candidate to replace Abdul Taib. Minister of Special Duties Adenan Satem and Minister of Resource Planning and Environment Awang Tengah Ali Hasan have also been touted as potential successors for Abdul Taib. Abdul Taib, on the other hand, nominated Adenan as his successor to Yang di-Pertua Negeri Abang Muhammad Salahuddin. Adenan was eventually named chief minister and took the oath of office on 28 February 2014. Adenan kept his predecessor's cabinet line-up after taking over the state administration, and would only reshuffle the cabinet after the state election. Adenan and Abang Johari had known one other from childhood as they were from the same village.

Deputy Chief Minister (2016–2017) 
Abang Johari was able to retain his seat after Barisan Nasional's resounding victory in the 2016 state election. Following that, Chief Minister Adenan promoted Abang Johari as the deputy chief minister, the post he served alongside Douglas Uggah Embas and James Jemut Masing. At the same time, Abang Johari has been entrusted with two cabinet positions, namely Minister of Tourism, Arts and Culture and Minister of Housing and Urbanisation.

Adenan's death 
Just six months after winning the state election, Chief Minister Adenan died of heart attack on 11 January 2017. The untimely demise is the first occurrence to a serving chief minister in Sarawak. Following Adenan's death, Abang Johari's name resurfaced as a possible successor, owing to his position as one of the ruling party's deputy presidents. Douglas Uggah Embas and Awang Tengah Ali Hasan are the other two deputy presidents of the party. The party, however, opted to observe the mourning period for Adenan's death before deciding on his successor. Abang Johari also stated that "it was improper to debate a successor for Chief Minister Adenan Satem while we are still mourning his death".

Adenan's death was mourned throughout the week, and many leaders attended his funeral in Kuching.

Chief Minister (2017–2022) 
Abang Johari was appointed as Adenan's successor by Yang di-Pertua Negeri Abdul Taib Mahmud. He was sworn in on 13 January 2017, and officially started his duty three days later. Days after he was sworn in, Abang Johari seemed in no hurry about making various statements to memorialise his predecessor Adenan, whose legacy was still fresh in the minds of the people of Sarawak.

First cabinet 

Following the end of the period of mourning for Adenan's death, Abang Johari indicated that he wished to keep the same cabinet lineup as during Adenan's administration. The Ministry of Finance was simply taken over by Abang Johari, who renamed it the Ministry of Finance and Economic Planning. On 25 January 2017, Abang Johari led his cabinet members in declaring and signing the corruption free pledge.

Abang Johari presented a new cabinet lineup in May 2017, nearly five months after taking office. He named Awang Tengah Ali Hasan as the deputy chief minister – a post that had been vacant after he was appointed chief minister. Abdul Karim Rahman Hamzah, Talib Zulpilip, Snowdan Lawan, and Abdullah Saidol are among the new faces in the cabinet. In August 2019, Abang Johari reshuffled his cabinet.

UEC recognition and Chinese schools 
In February 2017, Abang Johari pledged to keep recognising the Unified Examinations Certificate (UEC) and providing financial help to Chinese schools in Sarawak, saying that "Sarawak would lose a lot of human capital" if it does not recognise UEC.

To encourage Chinese education, the state government has allocated RM10 million each year, equivalent to the amount granted to missionary schools. The Chinese community's insistence on education has also been recognised by the government, which has allowed them to open their own schools and promote Chinese education. Abang Johari has also assured that all UEC holders can apply for jobs in the state civil service with such qualifications.

Religious and racial affairs 

In March 2017, Abang Johari remained adamant in his opposition to the state's implementation of the hudud law, saying that he had the same views as his predecessor Adenan. According to him, the state government is concerned that the hudud bill's penalties are "discriminatory between Muslims and non-Muslims".

Under Abang Johari's leadership, the state government formed the Other Religious Affairs Unit (UNIFOR) in April 2017 to aid all religions and protect the interests and welfare of Sarawak's non-Muslims. The state government has set aside a particular fund to help other religions with things like house of worship construction, maintenance, and upgrades through UNIFOR. Sarawak is the only state in Malaysia that can channel funds to support other religions, hence the founding of this unit made history. Deputy Chief Minister Douglas Uggah Embas is in charge of UNIFOR.

Abang Johari has always reminded the non-Muslims in Sarawak that they are allowed to use the word "Allah" at any time, saying that "it's not human beings who judge themselves as pious but it is God".

Abang Johari has also consistently prioritised the interests of all races in Sarawak. After many Dayak Cultural Foundation (DCF) development projects and the new building of the Dayak Bidayuh National Association (DBNA) were approved during his administration, the Wisma Melayu Sarawak building is indicative of the state government's willingness to give amenities to all races.

Land rights 
In April 2017, Abang Johari said that the state government would work to ensure that land owned by the Malay community in the state's urban centres remained in the hands of the Malay community and their descendants. In August 2020, Abang Johari announced that the state government acknowledged and defended the people's rights to Native Customary Rights (NCR) Land. The Sarawak Native Customary Rights Land Survey Programme was launched by Abang Johari and consists of two stages: perimeter measuring under Section 6 of the state land code and individual lot measurement under Section 18 of the same code.

BN's loss in GE14 
In the 2018 federal election, Barisan Nasional (BN) suffered a crushing defeat, losing a large number of seats. Despite this, BN did not lose at the state level in Sarawak, despite losing a number of parliamentary seats. Following the devastating loss, the coalition's four component parties, Parti Pesaka Bumiputera Bersatu (PBB), Parti Rakyat Sarawak (PRS), Sarawak United Peoples' Party (SUPP), and Progressive Democratic Party (PDP), all of which operate solely in Sarawak, announced their departure from the coalition on 12 June 2018, led by Abang Johari.

Establishment of GPS 
After leaving BN, Abang Johari then formed a new coalition of the four local political parties known as Gabungan Parti Sarawak or abbreviated as GPS, thus becoming its chairman. 

The coalition focuses on Sarawak's interests and rights based on the Malaysia Agreement (MA63) and remain an opposition at the Pakatan Harapan (PH) federal government. On 23 August 2018, Abang Johari announced that GPS has been registered and is awaiting the issuance of the official letter from the Registrar of Societies. The coalition was finally legalised on 19 November 2018.

2020 federal political crisis 

Following the 2020 Malaysian political crisis which saw the PH federal government lose its majority in the Dewan Rakyat, GPS entered into an agreement by declaring support for the new government coalition, Perikatan Nasional (PN), led by Muhyiddin Yassin. Abang Johari, however, maintained that the agreement will not see GPS become a member of PN, but will remain as a partner instead for the sake of political stability. Armed with the support of 18 MPs from GPS and several other MPs, Muhyiddin was appointed as the eighth Prime Minister by the Yang di-Pertuan Agong.

By mid-2021, the political crisis at the federal level had worsened when several MPs from UMNO, one of the components of Barisan Nasional, withdrew support for Muhyiddin. Even so, GPS under Abang Johari remained steadfast in its stance to continue supporting the Muhyiddin-led federal government, saying that "now is not the time for politicking but rather for uniting to face the pandemic crisis".

The political crisis culminated in August 2021 when Prime Minister Muhyiddin Yassin resigned after losing majority. Following the event, Deputy Prime Minister Ismail Sabri Yaakob was touted and nominated to replace Muhyiddin. GPS has unanimously supported Ismail Sabri, and Ismail Sabri was eventually appointed as the ninth Prime Minister on 20 August 2021.

COVID-19 pandemic 

COVID-19 officially spread throughout Sarawak in March 2020. In response, Abang Johari announced a two-week stay home order on everyone entering the state as part of measures to prevent the escalation of the disease. Meanwhile, Prime Minister Muhyiddin Yassin announced the implementation the movement control order (MCO). MCO started nationwide including Sarawak from 18 March 2020 and was extended in various stages until June 2021. The federal government then introduced a four-phase National Recovery Plan (NRP) to help the nation emerge from the COVID-19 pandemic and its economic fallout, which also includes Sarawak. As of January 2022, Sarawak is now in the last phase of NRP. Sarawak has been praised by Director General of Health Noor Hisham Abdullah and become an example to other states in Malaysia for successfully curbing the spread of COVID-19.

In response to the various impacts of COVID-19, more than RM5.6 billion was spent by the Abang Johari-led state government to implement a few aid packages to help the people affected by COVID-19 known as Bantuan Khas Sarawakku Sayang (BKSS). In almost two years, a total of eight BKSS packages have been announced by the chief minister involving more than 30 initiatives.

In January 2021, a big wave of COVID-19 has hit Sarawak. Abang Johari then has announced that the state will begin a vaccination programme to combat the rise in COVID-19 infections. In February 2021, he received his first dose of the Pfizer–BioNTech COVID-19 vaccine, publicly taking the vaccine on live television. He returned for his second dose in March 2021.

Sarawak has become one of Malaysia's fastest states in terms of vaccinating its citizens, with COVID-19 cases in the state dropping in July 2021. However, with the emergence of the Delta variant, Sarawak saw a significant spike in cases, which peaked in mid-September 2021. Abang Johari then announced that the state government will enhance vaccination, particularly booster doses.  Infections in the state have reduced dramatically since early November 2021, following the massive booster doses vaccination. The state's vaccination programme has fully inoculated over 75.2% of the population and 91.7% of adults .

Economic affairs 
Abang Johari is well known for his digital economy initiatives and efforts for Sarawak. Shortly after assuming office, he established state's digital economy plan, known as "Sarawak Digital Economy Strategy 2018–2022", with the goal of transforming the state's economy through digital transformation to attain high-income status and become a developed state by 2030.

In this digital economy plan, 47 strategic plans were given in eight economic sectors, including agriculture, manufacturing, tourism, and smart city. The digital health, e-commerce, and digital government sectors, as well as social sports, arts, and culture, are among the other sectors.

Under Abang Johari's leadership, a regulatory body and multimedia authority for Sarawak, known as Sarawak Multimedia Authority (SMA), has been established in 2017 to spearhead its digital economy including the development of digital infrastructure, cyber security, talent development, e-commerce, research and development in digital technology, digital innovation and entrepreneurship and digital government in the state.

Development Bank of Sarawak (DBOS) was also established by Abang Johari with the goal of financing infrastructure projects relating to the Internet, transportation systems, renewable energy sector development projects, the oil and gas industry, healthcare, and modern agriculture. It became a new source of funding for state development projects, altering the state government's financial model.

Restoring Sarawak status 

According to Abang Johari, the establishment GPS was inspired by the spirit sparked by his predecessor Adenan in fighting for the rights of Sarawak as enshrined in the Malaysia Agreement 1963 (MA63). Abang Johari also vowed to continue the legacy of Adenan's struggle to claim all Sarawak's rights that have been eroded.

In September 2021, Prime Minister Ismail Sabri Yaakob pledged to look into issues relating to Sarawak including Sabah via the Special Council on MA63, with negotiations being chaired by the prime minister, joined by Abang Johari as Sarawak's chief minister and Hajiji Noor as Sabah's chief minister, as well as eight federal ministers. One month later, the federal government announced a bill to be tabled in the coming Parliament sitting after the Special Council on MA63 agreed to Articles 1(2) and 160(2) of the Federal Constitution to restore Sabah and Sarawak as equal partners to Peninsular Malaysia. The same meeting also saw the council agree to empower both the Sabah and Sarawak governments to issue deep fishing licences as opposed to the federal government currently. The amendments were tabled on 3 November 2021, consisting of four changes, being restoring Sabah and Sarawak as "territories", defining Malaysia Day as the day when Sabah and Sarawak joined and changes to the definition of the Federation, and defining who are natives of Sabah and Sarawak. On 14 December 2021, the proposed amendment was passed in the Parliament unanimously. According to Abang Johari, the approval of the bill is part of the previous efforts of GPS to defend the rights as in MA63 in accordance with the law. He said that the restoration of Sarawak's status in MA63 was a key factor in GPS's victory in the 2021 state election.

Oil and gas rights 
In June 2017, Abang Johari announced that Sarawak will establish a state-owned oil and gas exploration company as well as the petroleum company would be 100% owned by the state and will work with PETRONAS on an equal basis. It was eventually formed on 7 August 2017 and known as Petroleum Sarawak Berhad (PETROS). The Sarawak government aimed to have PETROS in operation by the first quarter of 2018 and become an active player in the oil and gas industry by 2020.

In July 2017, the government of Sarawak under Abang Johari sent a legal team to the United Kingdom to search for additional supporting documents regarding the Sarawak's rights in the MA63. Among them are  Sarawak (Alteration of Boundaries) Order 1954 by the Queen in Council, which stated that Sarawak boundary covers way beyond the three nautical miles. Four months later, Sarawak has formed a special task force to negotiate with PETRONAS regarding the return of Sarawak oil and gas rights. The state was unwilling to resort to court action to nullify the Territorial Sea Act and PETRONAS dominance on Sarawak waters so as to preserve the good relationship between the federal and state government.

In February 2018, Abang Johari questioned the validity of the 1974 Petroleum Development Act. This was because the Act was passed during the Emergency Proclamation period from 1969 to 2011. The Emergency Proclamation was abolished in 2011. This raises questions that whether the Petroleum Development Act would cease to become effective after 2011. He also stated that the Petroleum Development Act does not exclude laws such as Sarawak Oil Mining Ordinance 1958 which stated that only Sarawak has the right to issue mining licenses for oil production. In April 2018, the chief minister also announced that under Oil Mining Ordinance 1958 and Gas Distribution Ordinance 2016, PETRONAS would need to apply mining license from PETROS to operate in Sarawak waters by July 2018. Abang Johari also said that under the Item 2(c) of the State List, Ninth Schedule of the Federal Constitution, PETROS is able to exercise its rights on Sarawak waters. PETRONAS had welcomed PETROS into the oil and gas mining scene as long as PETROS acted within the framework of Malaysian Petroleum Development Act, 1974. However, the opposition politicians in Sarawak cast doubts on whether Sarawak has truly regained its oil and gas rights without making any amendments to the existing laws in the country. In April 2018, the opposition coalition, Pakatan Harapan offered a 20% oil royalty deal for Sarawak government if the former wins the federal power in the 2018 general election, however, Sarawak refused to sign it because it has no legal standing.

After the elections, Malaysian federal government changed hands to Pakatan Harapan. On 22 May 2018, PETRONAS responded to Sarawak state attorney-general that it disagrees that PETRONAS need to apply license from PETROS to operate in Sarawak waters. On 4 June 2018, PETRONAS filed a suit in the Federal Court of Malaysia in order to assert its position as the exclusive owner of Malaysian oil resources (including Sarawak) and the 1974 Petroleum Development Act is still valid. On 22 June 2018, the federal court of Malaysia denied PETRONAS application to start legal proceedings against Sarawak because the case is not within the jurisdiction of the federal court. On 10 July 2018, Sarawak state assembly passed the Oil Mining (Amendment) Bill (2018) in order to regulate oil and gas activities in the state. All oil and gas companies operating in Sarawak waters would be given grace period until the end of 2019 to comply with Oil Mining Ordinance (OMO) 1958.

Since 1 January 2019, Sarawak enforced 5% sales on all petroleum products. Initially, PETRONAS was given dateline until end of September 2019 to pay the sales tax. After that, PETRONAS was given until end of October 2019 to pay the sales tax. In September 2019, Prime Minister Mahathir Mohamad stated that payment of 20% oil royalty is not possible for Sabah and Sarawak because it may compromise financial status of PETRONAS. On 21 November 2019, the Sarawak government filed a suit against PETRONAS for not paying the 5% sales tax.

In February 2020, PETROS took full control of natural gas supply, sales, and distribution network in the state from PETRONAS. In March 2020, high court ruled that Sarawak has the power to impose sales tax on PETRONAS. On 8 May 2020, PETRONAS agreed to pay RM 2 billion in petroleum products sales tax to Sarawak with a condition that the tax will be lowered on a staggered basis in the future. Besides, both parties also agreed that the Petroleum Development Act 1974 is valid with PETRONAS as the sole regulator of oil and gas industry in Malaysia. In October 2020, Sarawak government issued mining leases in Miri and Marudi to PETROS for onshore oil and gas mining. In year 2020, PETROS started to distribute liquefied petroleum gas (LPG) to 1,500 business and 2,500 households in Miri and Bintulu. In December 2020, PETROS launched its own brand of LPG gas cylinder.

2021 state election 

As the previous state legislative assembly first sat on 7 June 2016, it was originally set to be dissolved automatically on 7 June 2021. However, the 2021 state emergency declaration, preceded by a federal 2021 state of emergency declaration nationwide, arising from the federal political crisis and the COVID-19 pandemic, suspended the automatic dissolution of the legislature until the proposed end of the emergency duration on 2 February 2022. On 3 November 2021, Yang di-Pertuan Agong Al-Sultan Abdullah Ri'ayatuddin Al-Mustafa Billah Shah had consented to lift the state of emergency thus the state legislative assembly dissolved automatically and the state election must be held within 60 days after to elect a new state government, and an election called for 18 December.

From Satok to Gedong 
The election has seen the nomination of Abang Johari to contest the constituency seat of Gedong after its incumbent decided to not running for re-election. As a result, he had to leave his previous seat in Satok, which he had held for nearly 40 years. According to Abang Johari, he wants to serve in rural areas before he retires.

Aftermath 
The election resulted in GPS winning an overwhelming landslide, gaining 76 out of 82 seats and a supermajority over the legislature. With such victory, political observers predict that GPS will continue to wield power in determining which national party will form the federal government after the 15th general election, while opposition parties such as Democratic Action Party (DAP) and People's Justice Party (PKR) will see their influence erode.

Premier (2022–present) 
After a state constitutional amendment was successfully passed on 15 February 2022, Abang Johari's position as Chief Minister was changed to Premier. The constitutional amendment was published in the Gazette and went into force on 1 March.

Personal life 
Abang Johari married Juma'ani Tuanku Bujang on 26 February 1977. Juma'ani's father, Tuanku Bujang Tuanku Othman was the second Yang di-Pertua Negeri of Sarawak. The couple have a son and a daughter; Abang Abdillah Izzarim and Dayang Norjihan.

On 7 March 2022, Abang Johari announced that he had tested positive for COVID-19.

Election results

Honours

Honours of Malaysia 
  :
  Commander of the Order of the Defender of the Realm (PMN) – Tan Sri (2021)
  :
 Companion of the Most Exalted Order of the Star of Sarawak (JBS) (1985)
 Recipient of the Meritorious Service Medal-Silver (PPB) (1988)
 Knight Commander of the Most Exalted Order of the Star of Sarawak (PNBS) – Dato Sri (1990)
 Knight Commander of the Order of the Star of Hornbill Sarawak (DA) – Datuk Amar (2008) 
 Knight Grand Commander of the Order of the Star of Hornbill Sarawak (DP) – Datuk Patinggi (2017)

Honorary degrees 
 :
 Honorary Doctorate in Business and Management from University of Technology Sarawak (2017)
 Honorary Doctorate in Economic Development Degree from Universiti Malaysia Sarawak (2018)
 :
 Honorary Doctorate of the University Award from Swinburne University of Technology (2018)

Notes

References

External links 

 Abang Abdul Rahman Zohari Abang Openg on Facebook

1950 births
Living people
20th-century Malaysian politicians
21st-century Malaysian politicians
Alumni of Brunel University London
Chief Ministers of Sarawak
Commanders of the Order of the Defender of the Realm
Deputy Chief Ministers of Sarawak
Knights Commander of the Most Exalted Order of the Star of Sarawak
Knights Commander of the Order of the Star of Hornbill Sarawak
Knights Grand Commander of the Order of the Star of Hornbill Sarawak
Leaders of political parties in Malaysia
Malaysian Muslims
Malaysian people of Malay descent
Members of the Sarawak State Legislative Assembly
Parti Pesaka Bumiputera Bersatu politicians
People from Sarawak
Sarawak politicians
Sarawak state ministers